The China Railways DFH1 was a type of 4-axle B'B' single-cab diesel-hydraulic locomotive used on mainline passenger services; the DFH3 was a later development of a similar design but with two driving cabs.

The China Railways DFH4 was a 6-axle high-powered freight and passenger locomotive, it did not reach mass production.

China Railways DFH1

The first prototype unit (NY1) (neiran yeli chuandong meaning diesel-hydraulic transmission) was produced in 1959 at Sifang locomotive works, and given the name 'Weixing'.

Locomotive design was similar to German diesel-hydraulic machines such as the DB Class V 200 - the machine had a pair of high-speed diesel engines, each driving a separate hydraulic torque converter based transmission resulting in low mass compared to contemporary diesel-electric machines.

Series production began in 1964. The locomotive was used for passenger trains. The locomotives could be worked in multiple, and were often used in this way, with a cab at each end. They operated on the Beijing Shenyang passenger trains.

China Railways DFH3
The DFH3 shares the same twin engine and twin hydraulic transmission as the DFH1 but is a two-cab design.

The production of the DFH3 follows on from the DFH1. The class were used on passenger trains in northeast China, by 2010 most had been displaced, and some are believed to being used in industrial service.

North Korea
Between 2000 and 2002, thirty second-hand DFH3 were imported by the Korean State Railway for operation in North Korea, numbered 내연901 to 내연930, although 내연903 is a Beijing class locomotive. Many are still in their original Chinese livery of blue and white, but some have been repainted into several different liveries, including the standard North Korean light blue over dark green, along with non-standard schemes of white over green, green with a yellow stripe, and green with a white stripe.

China Railways DFH4
The Qishuyan Ziyang Diesel locomotive works manufactured six locomotives of type DFH4 between 1969 and 1981. The first unit was produced in 1969 with an overall  machine with twin engine and hydraulic transmission. Two  machines were produced in 1971 and 1974. Between 1975 and 1981 the Ziyang plant investigated the manufacture of further locomotives using the 12V200ZJ engine.

See also
 China Railways DFH shunting locomotives, Contemporary Chinese diesel-hydraulic locomotives used primarily for shunting

Preservation
One unit, locomotive number DFH1 4290 is an exhibit at the Beijing China Railway Museum, all other units have been destroyed except DFH1 4222 which is believed to be at the locomotive museum in Shenyang. The Beijing museum also stores DFH3 0009.

References

DFH1
Locomotives of North Korea
Bo-Bo locomotives
Standard gauge locomotives of China
Standard gauge locomotives of North Korea
Railway locomotives introduced in 1959
CRRC Qingdao Sifang locomotives
CSR Ziyang Locomotive Co., Ltd. locomotives
Qishuyan locomotives